Buckhead is a town in Morgan County, Georgia, United States. As of the 2020 census, the town had a population of 194.

History
The Georgia General Assembly incorporated Buckhead as a town in 1908. According to tradition, Buckhead was named from a pioneer incident when hunters shot a deer and publicly mounted the buck's head onto a tree.

Geography
Buckhead is located in southeastern Morgan County at  (33.568012, -83.362443).

The town is drained to the north by tributaries of the Apalachee River and to the south by tributaries of Sugar Creek, both of which flow southeast to the Oconee River.

Demographics

At the 2000 census there were 205 people, 68 households, and 55 families in the town. The racial makeup of the town was 65.37% White, 29.27% African American, 5.37% from other races. Hispanic or Latino of any race were 2.93%.

Of the 68 households 41.2% had children under the age of 18 living with them, 67.6% were married couples living together, 11.8% had a female householder with no husband present, and 19.1% were non-families. 14.7% of households were one person and 5.9% were one person aged 65 or older.  The average household size was 3.01 and the average family size was 3.36.

The age distribution was 32.7% under the age of 18, 6.8% from 18 to 24, 30.7% from 25 to 44, 22.0% from 45 to 64, and 7.8% 65 or older.  The median age was 32 years. For every 100 females, there were 109.2 males.  For every 100 females age 18 and over, there were 100.0 males.

The median household income was $35,208 and the median family income  was $36,458. Males had a median income of $30,179 versus $19,432 for females. The per capita income for the town was $13,253.  About 18.4% of families and 22.8% of the population were below the poverty line, including 27.1% of those under the age of eighteen and none of those sixty five or over.

References

Towns in Morgan County, Georgia
Towns in Georgia (U.S. state)